Salvatore Elia (born 30 June 1999) is an Italian professional footballer who plays as a forward for Serie B club Palermo, on loan from Atalanta.

Club career

Atalanta 
Born in Prato, Elia grew up playing in the youth teams of Atalanta.

Loan to Juve Stabia 
On 31 July 2018. Elia was signed by Serie C club Juve Stabia on a season-long loan deal. On 16 September he made his professional debut, in Serie C, as a substitute replacing Luigi Canotto in the 72nd minute of a 3–0 away win over Siracusa. On 20 November he played his first entire match for the team, a 4–0 home win over Viterbese Castrense. Two weeks later, on 2 December, Elia scored his first professional goal in the 85th minute of a 2–0 home win over Bisceglie. On 14 April 2019, he scored his second goal in the 71st minute of a 3–2 away win over Sicula Leonzio. Elia then scored his third goal in the 78th minute in a 2–2 home draw against Virtus Entella in the Supercoppa di Serie C on 18 May. He helped Juve Stabia win promotion to Serie B, with the club finishing as champions, and ended his loan spell with 32 appearances, 3 goals and 6 assists.

On 11 July 2019, his loan was extended for another season. One month later, on 11 August, Elia played his first match of the season, a 3–2 defeat on penalties after a 1–1 home draw against Imolese in the second round of the Coppa Italia. On 25 August he made his Serie B debut for Juve Stabia as a substitute replacing Giacomo Calò in the 82nd minute of a 2–1 away defeat against Empoli. One week later, on 1 September Elia played his first match as a starter, a 2–0 home defeat against Pisa, he was replaced after 68 minutes by Massimiliano Carlini. Two weeks later he played his first entire match for the club in Serie B, a 0–0 away draw against Perugia. On 20 June 2019, he scored his first goal in Serie B, as a substitute, in the 87th minute of a 3–1 away defeat against Pescara. Elia ended his second season at Juve Stabia with 21 appearances, 1 goal and 1 assist, however the club was relegated to Serie C.

Loan to Perugia 
On 25 September 2020, he joined Serie C club Perugia on a season-long loan deal. Two days later, on 27 September, he made his debut for the club as a substitute replacing Vlad Dragomir in the 77th minute of a 2–2 home draw against Alma Juventus Fano. On 18 October he played his first entire match for the club, a 2–0 home win over Fermana. On 6 December he scored his first goal for the club in the 29th minute of a 2–0 home win over Imolese. On 17 February 2021, Elia scored twice in a 4–0 home win over Legnago Salus. Elia ended his season-long loan to Perugia with 40 appearances, 30 of them as a starter, 9 goals and 4 assists, he also helped the club to win the championship and to gain the promotion in Serie B after only one season in Serie C.

Loan to Benevento 
On 20 July 2021, Elia joined Serie B club Benevento on a season-long loan.

Loan to Palermo 
On 28 July 2022, Elia agreed upon a one-year loan to Serie B club Palermo.

Personal life 
He is the son of former professional footballer Firmino Elia.

Career statistics

Club

Honours

Club 
Juve Stabia

 Serie C (Group C): 2018–19
Perugia

 Serie C (Group B): 2020–21

References

External links 
 

1999 births
Living people
Italian footballers
Serie C players
Serie B players
S.S. Juve Stabia players
A.C. Perugia Calcio players
Benevento Calcio players
Palermo F.C. players
People from Prato
Association football forwards
Sportspeople from the Province of Prato
Footballers from Tuscany